Temporelli is a surname. Notable people with the surname include:
 Christopher Temporelli, American opera singer
 Sandra Temporelli (born 1969), French cyclist

Italian-language surnames